Jat Airways was rebranded as Air Serbia in October 2013. This is a list of destinations that the carrier served until then. The list includes former destinations served as Jat Airways, JAT-Yugoslav Airlines and Aeroput, as well as future ones resumed as Air Serbia.

For a current overview see Air Serbia destinations.

List

See also
 List of Air Serbia destinations
 List of Aeroput destinations

References

D
Jat Airways